Ballynahatty is a townland in County Down, Northern Ireland. It lies on the southern edge of Belfast. It contains the Giants Ring, a henge monument.

The remains of a woman who was part of a Neolithic farming community were discovered buried in the henge in 1855. Now known as Ballynahatty woman, her genome was sequenced in 2015 and reveals a woman with black hair and brown eyes typical of those with Mediterranean heritage. This implies that Ballynahatty woman was part of a group of Early European Farmers (EEFs) that migrated across Europe in the Neolithic period, originating in the Middle East.

Ballynahatty is also the name of a townland, in the parish of Drumragh, County Tyrone.

References

Villages in County Down
Townlands of County Down
Civil parish of Drumbo